Margarita Armengol Fuster (born 17 May 1960) is a Spanish former freestyle swimmer who competed in the 1980 Summer Olympics.

She was born in Barcelona.

Notes

References

External links 
 
 
 
 

1960 births
Living people
Spanish female freestyle swimmers
Olympic swimmers of Spain
Swimmers at the 1980 Summer Olympics
20th-century Spanish women